Naval Special Operations Command#Units
Kenyan Special Boat Unit